The 2017 Men's Football at the 2017 Pacific Mini Games is the 1st edition of the international football tournament organized by the Oceania Football Confederation (OFC) for players who are playing in the Pacific Region.

Venues

Participating teams

Six teams participated in the tournament.

Squads

Officials

Group stage
The group stage fixtures were announced on 25 November 2017, with the games scheduled as a round-robin tournament.

Awards
The Golden Ball Award is awarded to the most outstanding player of the tournament. The Golden Glove Award is awarded to the best goalkeeper of the tournament. The Golden Boot Award is awarded to the top scorer of the tournament. The Fair Play Award is awarded to the team with the best disciplinary record at the tournament.

Goalscorers
7 goals

 Saula Waqa

6 goals

 Azariah Soromon

5 goals

 Christopher Wasasala
 Kensi Tangis
 Tony Kaltack

4 goals

 Adrian Mara
 Benjamin Totori

3 goals

 Gagame Feni
 Shene Wélépane

2 goals

 Rusiate Matarerega
 Gaétan Gope-Iwate
 Henry Fa'arodo
 Petueli Tokotaha
 Alopua Petoa
 Elkington Molivakarua

1 goals

 Napolioni Qasevakatini
 Dave Radrigai
 Antonio Tuivuna
 Romarick Luepak
 Jean-Baptiste Waitreu
 Jeffery Bule
 Jerry Donga
 Atkin Kaua
 Tutizama Tanito
 Unaloto Feao
 Hemaloto Polovili
 Kilifi Uele
 Taufaiva Ionatana
 Paulo Lotonu
 Matti Uaelesi
 Bong Kalo
 Jacky Ruben
 Alex Saniel

References

Football at the 2017 Pacific Mini Games